Bennett Springs is a census-designated place in Lincoln County, Nevada, United States. As of the 2010 census it had a population of 132.

Geography

Demographics

References

Census-designated places in Nevada
Census-designated places in Lincoln County, Nevada